"Notorious B.I.G." is a song and single by the Notorious B.I.G. from the album Born Again, which features Lil' Kim, and Puff Daddy. As a tribute song, Lil' Kim and Puff Daddy's verses have little relevance to Biggie's verse, which is about being in the hospital while being comforted by attractive female nurses. It samples the song "Notorious" by Duran Duran.

In February 2013, the song resurfaced on the Bubbling Under R&B/Hip-Hop Singles chart at #5 for one week.

Music video
The music video consists of Puff Daddy inviting a security guard (played by Tracy Morgan) to a house party, and a traffic jam, and a big party in the end glorifying Notorious B.I.G.  It features cameos from 98 Degrees, Krayzie Bone, Thug Queen, Cuban Link, Wish Bone, Missy Elliott, Nas, Jennifer Lopez, Lil' Cease, Fat Joe and others. Puff Daddy was also the director of the video.

Track listing

12-inch single
A-side
 "Notorious" (club mix) – 3:12
 "Notorious" (instrumental) – 3:12
B-side
 "Dead Wrong" (radio edit) – 3:12
 "Nasty Boy" (remix) – 4:15

Remix
A-side
 "Notorious" (remix) (dirty mix)
 "Notorious" (remix) (clean mix)
 "Notorious" (remix) (instrumental)
B-side
 "Biggie" (dirty mix)
 "Biggie" (clean mix)
 "Biggie" (instrumental)

CD single
 "The Notorious B.I.G." (radio mix)
 "The Notorious B.I.G." (club mix)
 "The Notorious B.I.G." (instrumental)
 "Dead Wrong" (Main w-o Eminem)
 "One More Chance"/"Stay with Me" (remix)

Charts

References

1999 singles
1999 songs
Bad Boy Records singles
Lil' Kim songs
Sean Combs songs
Songs released posthumously
Songs written by the Notorious B.I.G.
Songs written by Lil' Kim
Songs written by Simon Le Bon
Songs written by John Taylor (bass guitarist)
Songs written by Nick Rhodes
The Notorious B.I.G. songs